Stanley Leak (21 March 1886 – 10 January 1963) was an Australian cricketer. He played in one first-class match for South Australia in 1912/13.

See also
 List of South Australian representative cricketers

References

External links
 

1886 births
1963 deaths
Australian cricketers
South Australia cricketers
Cricketers from Adelaide